Ned O'Keeffe (born 1 August 1942) is a former Irish Fianna Fáil politician who served as a Minister of State from 1997 to 2001. He served as a Teachta Dála (TD) for the Cork East constituency from 1982 to 2011. He was a Senator from May 1982 to November 1982, after being nominated by the Taoiseach.

Early life
O'Keeffe was born in Ballindangan, Mitchelstown, County Cork, in 1942. He was educated at Darra College, Clonakilty, where he received a diploma in Social and Rural Science. O'Keeffe was a pig farmer before becoming involved in politics.

Political career
In 1982, he was nominated by the Taoiseach, Charles Haughey, to the 16th Seanad. He was first elected to the Dáil at the November 1982 general election for Cork East. He retained his seat at each general election until his retirement in 2011. He was also a member of Cork County Council for the local electoral area of Mallow from 1985 to 1997.

O'Keeffe served in a number of frontbench positions. He was Fianna Fáil Spokesperson on Industry from 1982 until 1987. While Fianna Fáil was in government between 1987 and 1994, O'Keeffe remained on the backbenches. 

Following an incident with RTÉ political correspondent Una Claffey in the Dáil bar in 1991, O'Keeffe apologised and said he had no option to resign but was persuaded to stay in order to prevent the government losing its majority.

When Bertie Ahern became party leader in 1994, O'Keeffe was appointed deputy Spokesperson on Enterprise and Employment, with responsibility for Commerce, Science, Technology and Small Business. After the 1997 general election, he was appointed as Minister of State at the Department of Agriculture and Food with responsibility for Food. He resigned as a minister of state in February 2001 after it emerged that he had voted on a Dáil motion without declaring that he had a beneficial interest in the subject matter.

On 28 November 2007, O'Keeffe resigned the Fianna Fáil party whip as he refused to support a motion of confidence in the Minister for Health and Children Mary Harney. On 26 February 2008, he was re-admitted to the Fianna Fáil parliamentary party.

He was an unsuccessful candidate at the 2009 European Parliament election for the South constituency. In the pre-election debate on Today FM he voiced his support for the use of nuclear power and an incinerator in Cork Harbour. He retired from politics at the 2011 general election.

Arrest
He was arrested on 27 April 2012, by members of the Garda Bureau of Fraud Investigation (GBFI) on suspicion of using a false invoice to claim for mobile phone expenses while he was a member of the Oireachtas. He was held for a number of hours at Cobh Garda station under section 26 of the Criminal Justice (Theft and Fraud Offences) Act 2001.

On the 1 December 2014, O'Keeffe was found guilty of fraudulently claiming in excess of €3,700 in mobile phone usage expenses. He was fined €3,500 and given a 7-month suspended jail sentence for his crime.

Family
O'Keeffe's son, Kevin, was a member of Cork County Council and was an unsuccessful candidate at the 2011 general election. Both Kevin and his other son, Ciarán, a solicitor based in Mitchelstown, sought to be added to the Fianna Fáil party ticket for Cork East in 2015. However, Ciarán later withdrew his attempt. News that they were going head to head surprised party supporters in the constituency and it was seen in some quarters as being a potentially divisive battle which could have undermined the party. Kevin O’Keeffe was elected to Dáil Éireann in the 2016 general election.

His wife, Anna O'Keeffe, died in 2017.

References

1942 births
Living people
Alumni of University College Cork
Fianna Fáil TDs
Irish farmers
Irish politicians convicted of crimes
Local councillors in County Cork
Members of the 16th Seanad
Members of the 24th Dáil
Members of the 25th Dáil
Members of the 26th Dáil
Members of the 27th Dáil
Members of the 28th Dáil
Members of the 29th Dáil
Members of the 30th Dáil
Ministers of State of the 28th Dáil
Politicians convicted of fraud
Nominated members of Seanad Éireann
Fianna Fáil senators